Michael Anthony Wiley (born October 16, 1957) is an American former basketball player. He was a 6'9" (2.06 m) 200 lb (91 kg) small forward and attended Long Beach State.

College career

Wiley attended Long Beach State University, where he played on the basketball team for coach Dwight Jones for two years, then under Hall of Fame coach Tex Winter for the next two years. Wiley was named Pacific Coast Athletic Association Tournament MVP in 1977 as a freshman in 1976-77 season, and would be named to the PCAA all-tourney team two more times (1978, 1980). He would lead the team in scoring twice, during the 1977–78 and 1979–1980 season. His 697 points in the 1979–80 season stands as the second best for a single season. In the 1978–79 season, Wiley lead the team in blocked shots at 1.9 per game. He is tied for the most points scored by a 49er in a postseason game with 31, and has the most Field Goals scored in a postseason game with 14, both of which were accomplished against Pepperdine in the 1980 National Invitation Tournament (NIT).

Wiley would end his career being given the distinction of being named an All-American. He also was named to the Pacific Coast Athletic Association all-conference first team, after being awarded second team distinction his first three seasons. As of the start of the 2010–11 basketball season, Wiley holds the record for most Field Goals made during a career and a season for Long Beach State, with 814 and 295 respectively. His .570 career shooting percentage still stands as the best in 49er history, and he stands as the second highest career rebounder as well.

In 1993, Wiley was inducted into the Long Beach State Athletic Hall of Fame. Wiley, dedicated his hall of fame speech to his mother Mrs. Geraldine Beverly Wiley, his aunt Yvonne Ruth, Charles Harris, his sisters and to his younger brother Morlon Wiley and best cuz ever my cousins and best cuz Elizabeth Ruth in his acceptance speech in 1993. My goal in life is to always to be grateful for all the people in your life, this my personal philosophy that I try to pass on to everyone I meet in life!

Professional Background & Career

Wiley played for the San Antonio Spurs of the NBA during the 1980–81 season, averaging 5.7 points and 1.9 rebounds per game in only 8.5 minutes. He was originally selected by the Spurs with the 16th pick in the second round of the 1980 NBA draft. The following season, he played for the San Diego Clippers, averaging 8.3 points and 3.0 rebounds per game in only 12.0 minutes, making him one of the most accurate and proficient scorers in NBA history. He shot a consistent .565 or 57% from the field and averaged 11 minutes per game. Wiley also had one of the highest points per minutes played rating in NBA history, he also shot 56.1% in two seasons as a small forward and has been consistently shooting over 57% for his entire basketball career and in the league. Known for jumping out of the gym and dunking on players who were taller and stronger than Wiley. Tex Winter once said Wiley was one of the fastest and quickest big men in the country, and is as smooth as silk when he played. Players that Wiley patterned his game like were Jamaal Wilkes, George "Iceman" Gervin and Julius "Dr. J Erving.

Personal

Michael Anthony Wiley (Basketball, NBA)
Wiley is currently living with his lovely wife, Whitnie C Wiley.

Nationality
Michael Anthony Wiley, traces his ancestry back to the Olmec in South America, making him a so called African-American but a true (Indigenous - Aboriginal) of the America's according to his ancestry history. Born in New Orleans, Louisiana, in 1957 to Mrs' Geraldine Harris Wiley and grew up with his stepfather Mr. JB Wiley, who is the father of his siblings - June, Jeanie & Morlon Wiley, however, Michael A Wiley, is the son of Lester Williams of New Orleans, Louisiana when Michael was born in 1957. Michael Anthony Williams-Wiley is his family birth legal name.

Siblings
Wiley is the older brother of fellow NBA alum Morlon Wiley.

He has four adult children, Theron (Deceased), Ariana, Muonia and Migeria and 7 grand children. Three sisters, June, Jeanie, Jonika and one brother Morlon.

Business Ownership Background
Michael is currently a partner with Mr. LaSalle Thompson, former NBA pro as well, they own a business consulting firm registered in Nevada. The company is GlobalOne Financial, LLC, offering small business consulting services to entrepreneurs and owners of small businesses seeking advice on how to start their own business. We also secure funding to help grow the businesses. GlobalOne offers business plans, budget plans, loans, commercial mortgages, loan packaging and lending services. We work closely with the SBA, other banks, by offering small businesses an alternative funding source in the United States since 2010. As a consulting firm, specializing in Minority own businesses, we have the ability to fund any business that has been turned down by traditional banks or lending institutions for a loan.

Software & Loan Program
We also created and have the only alternative funding source for so called African-American own businesses that banks will not or cannot provide funding to minority own businesses. Not only that, we created the first loan underwriting Software Program in 2002, to underwrite any type of loan without the biases or discrimination, associated with today's lending process for Women & Minorities. We have underwritten over $730 Million using this loan program!

History
After retiring from basketball in 1990, Wiley began his career in real estate mortgage finance as a residential mortgage broker. Moving from there into commercial mortgage finance with a partner back in 1994. Later that year, he started his own finance and business plan writing business in 1995, to assist small businesses with private funding.

Work Experience Background
Wiley is also an experienced construction contractor since 1997 building large box stores for Walmart and Home Depot, specializing in store construction, interior design, store setup and organizational team management. In 2000, he joined Foxwoods Resort & Casino in Connecticut as a Corporate Organizational Corporate Ombudsman. The Ombudsman position required Michael Wiley to have several cross-sectional skills in areas of business, including: Banking, Business finance, Legal contracting, Marketing, Business planning, Construction knowledge & Budgeting. Accounting, and the understanding of Capital Markets and overall business acumen for making on the spot decisions, in his position at Foxwoods Resort & Casino.

Latest Business Ventures
Mr. Wiley is entering the EV Market with several new ventures in the Electric Battery space and EV Cars, & 3D Printed Homes. The company is seeking partners to help finance the 3D Printed Homes to help solve the Homeless situation we face in the United States, South America and Africa. We have the only alternative and affordable home solution in the country today. Contact me for more details!

Business 
FINANCE:  Michael Wiley began his professional career in finance in 1991 after retiring from professional basketball NBA & European leagues. Before returning to the USA he was trained in finance via UBS bank training program. In addition, he studied investment & capital markets on a special program from Credit Switzerland  bank. The career in finance and banking has provided unique opportunities and  various investments over the years.

ELECTRIC CARS: Michael Wiley today enjoys rebuilding old fast cars and trucks. His current interest is electric vehicles like Tesla.  He is currently working with several privately owned battery and EV car design firms or technology companies to develop a long range battery for EV cars. Wiley has worked with these private EV companies and have achieved a charging range of over 500 to 723 miles on battery test today.  The technology we have is already there for us right now, however, funding is always the key to bringing any new changing technology to market. Many people from the sports world and leaders in the electric car industry, have been quoted an saying "Michael's ambition closely rivals that of Elon Musk or any top athlete.

GLOBALONE FINANCIAL: Michael Wiley founded GlobalOne Financial in 2005 to assist clients in securing investment capital for new and innovative projects throughout the United States. To date the company has processed more than $700 Million in project funding. The company is currently pursuing a new loan program to assist individuals and small businesses with capital. These loans will be $400,000 to assist people in dealing with the pandemic and to keep our economy functioning as we all deal with the pandemic. As part of this new loan program we will continue to finance larger projects with our instruments funding program. The instrument lending program consist of utilizing SBLCs, Bank Guarantees and MTN’s from the capital markets.

External links
NBA stats @ basketballreference.com

1980 NBA Draft overall
 https://www.landofbasketball.com/draft/1980_nba_draft.htm

Stats on Michael Wiley
Wiley - 39 Pick in NBA 1980
 https://www.landofbasketball.com/nba_players/michael_wiley.htm

References

1957 births
Living people
African-American basketball players
American expatriate basketball people in France
American expatriate basketball people in Monaco
American expatriate basketball people in the Netherlands
American men's basketball players
Basketball players from Long Beach, California
Long Beach State Beach men's basketball players
San Antonio Spurs draft picks
San Antonio Spurs players
San Diego Clippers players
Small forwards
21st-century African-American people
20th-century African-American sportspeople
Long Beach Polytechnic High School alumni